Chung Jae-won (born 21 June 2001) is a South Korean speed skater. He competed in the 2018 Winter Olympics and won a silver medal in the  team pursuit event. As a result, Chung became the youngest Korean speed skater to win a medal at the Olympics.

References

External links

2001 births
Living people
Speed skaters at the 2018 Winter Olympics
Speed skaters at the 2022 Winter Olympics
South Korean male speed skaters
Olympic speed skaters of South Korea
Medalists at the 2018 Winter Olympics
Medalists at the 2022 Winter Olympics
Olympic medalists in speed skating
Olympic silver medalists for South Korea
Speed skaters from Seoul
21st-century South Korean people